Cobalt monosilicide (CoSi) is an intermetallic compound, a silicide of cobalt. It is a diamagnetic  semimetal with an electrical resistivity of ca. 1 mOhm·cm.

References

Cobalt compounds
Transition metal silicides
Iron monosilicide structure type